Korai or Karai, also rendered as Korahi, may refer to:
 Karai, Iran, Fars Province
 Korai, Marvdasht, Fars Province
 Korai-ye Olya, Khuzestan Province
 Korai-ye Sofla, Khuzestan Province